Jean Martineau may refer to:
 Jean Martineau (lawyer), Canadian lawyer, judge and president of the Canada Council for the Arts
 Jean Martineau (ice hockey), ice hockey executive
 Jean Colbert Martineau, radio broadcaster